West Industrial is a light industrial area in Saskatoon, Saskatchewan, Canada.  This neighbourhood extends north of 11th Street, south of the rail and west of Avenue P south.

References

External links

Local Area Planning
Selling an Idea or a Product

Neighbourhoods in Saskatoon